Darby House or The Darby House or variations may refer to:

in England
Darby Houses, in Coalbrookdale, a museum in Shropshire

in the United States
(by state then town)
E. H. Darby Lustron House, Florence, Alabama, a Lustron house that is listed on the National Register of Historic Places (NRHP) in Lauderdale County
The Darby House (Dawson Springs, Kentucky), listed on the NRHP in Hopkins County
Darby House (Baldwin, Louisiana), listed on the NRHP in St. Mary Parish
Darby House, of Darby Plantation (New Iberia, Louisiana), listed on the NRHP in Iberia Parish
Darby House, of Darby Store historic site, in Beallsville, Maryland
Darby House, the main house of Darby Dan Farm, in Galloway, Ohio
Darby Meeting, also known as Darby Friends Meeting House, in Darby, Pennsylvania, NRHP-listed
Darby House, of Darby Plantation (Edgefield, South Carolina), listed on the NRHP in Edgefield County

See also
Darby Plantation (disambiguation)